is a passenger railway station located in the city of Mitoyo, Kagawa Prefecture, Japan. It is operated by JR Shikoku and has the station number "D18".

Lines

Layout
The station, which is unstaffed, consists of a side platform and an island platform serving three tracks. A building adjacent to the side platform serves as a passenger waiting room. A pedestrian level crossing spanning two tracks gives access to the island platform. Parking and a bike shed are available.

Adjacent stations

History
With the privatization of JNR on 1 April 1987, control of the station passed to JR Shikoku.

Surrounding area
An 800-year old tabunoki tree near the station entrance is designated Kagawa Prefectural Protected Tree No. 92.
A broadleaf forest with tabunoki trees at the Itsukushima Shinto shrine (厳島神社) is a designated Kagawa Prefectural Natural Monument.

See also
 List of railway stations in Japan

References

External links

 JR Shikoku timetable

Railway stations in Kagawa Prefecture
Railway stations in Japan opened in 1923
Mitoyo, Kagawa